James McIntosh is an American former Negro league third baseman who played in the 1930s.

McIntosh played for the Detroit Stars in 1937. In three recorded games, he went hitless in five plate appearances.

References

External links
Baseball statistics and player information from Baseball-Reference Black Baseball Stats and Seamheads

Year of birth missing
Place of birth missing
Detroit Stars (1937) players
Baseball third basemen